Eudesmus grisescens is a species of beetle in the family Cerambycidae. It was described by Audinet-Serville in 1835. It is known from Brazil, Bolivia, Nicaragua, Peru and French Guiana.

References

Onciderini
Beetles described in 1835